"If I Could Be with You (One Hour Tonight)" is a popular song.  The music was written by James P. Johnson, the lyrics by Henry Creamer. The song was published in 1926 and first recorded by Clarence Williams' Blue Five with vocalist Eva Taylor in 1927. It was popularized by the 1930 recording by McKinney's Cotton Pickers, who used it as their theme song and by Louis Armstrong's record for Okeh Records (catalogue No.41448), both of which featured in the charts of 1930. Armstrong's recording of "If I Could Be with You" is defined by his sparse vocal style and ornamental virtuosic trumpet-playing.

References

See also
List of 1920s jazz standards

Songs with music by James P. Johnson
Songs with lyrics by Henry Creamer
1926 songs
1920s jazz standards
Carmen McRae songs
Pop standards
Okeh Records singles